American Genocide may refer to:

 American Holocaust (book)
 Genocide of indigenous peoples in the United States
 Black genocide in the United States